{{DISPLAYTITLE:C28H31ClN2O3}}
The molecular formula C28H31ClN2O3 (molar mass: 479.010 g/mol, exact mass: 478.2023 u) may refer to:

 Rhodamine 6G
 Rhodamine B